William Redman Claypool (July 16, 1843 – May 26, 1888) was a California based trainer of Thoroughbred racehorses who won the 1885 Belmont Stakes with the colt Tyrant for nationally prominent owner J. B. A. Haggin. A major racing event on the East Coast, the Belmont Stakes would become the third leg of the U.S. Triple Crown series. That same year Claypool trained the two-year-old colt Ben Ali who would go on to win the 1886 Kentucky Derby.

Just two years after his success on the East Coast, William Claypool died at age 44 from Consumption.

References

1843 births
1888 deaths
American horse trainers
People from Andrew County, Missouri
19th-century deaths from tuberculosis
Tuberculosis deaths in California